False Radiosity is a 3D computer graphics technique used to create texture mapping for objects that emulates patch interaction algorithms in radiosity rendering. Though practiced in some form since the late 90s, this term was coined only around 2002 by architect Andrew Hartness, then head of 3D and real-time design at Ateliers Jean Nouvel.

During the period of nascent commercial enthusiasm for radiosity-enhanced imagery, but prior to the democratization of powerful computational hardware, architects and graphic artists experimented with time-saving 3D rendering techniques. By darkening areas of texture maps corresponding to corners, joints and recesses, and applying maps via self-illumination or diffuse mapping in a 3D program, a radiosity-like effect of patch interaction could be created with a standard scan-line renderer. Successful emulation of radiosity required a theoretical understanding and graphic application of patch view factors, path tracing and global illumination algorithms. Texture maps were usually produced with image editing software, such as Adobe Photoshop. The advantage of this method is decreased rendering time and easily modifiable overall lighting strategies.

Another common approach similar to false radiosity is the manual placement of standard omni-type lights with limited attenuation in places in the 3D scene where the artist would expect radiosity reflections to occur. This method uses many lights and can require an advanced light-grouping system, depending on what assigned materials/objects are illuminated, how many surfaces require false radiosity treatment, and to what extent it is anticipated that lighting strategies be set up for frequent changes.

References
Autodesk interview with Hartness about False Radiosity and real-time design

See also
Ambient occlusion
CGarchitect interviewReal-time 3D design 

3D computer graphics
Computer graphics algorithms
Image processing
Rendering systems